Edwin Soergel (April 3, 1930 – December 1975) was a Canadian football player who played for the Toronto Argonauts. He won the Grey Cup with them in 1952. He previously played football at and attended Eastern Illinois University. He is a member of the Eastern Illinois Panthers Hall of Fame.

References

1930 births
Toronto Argonauts players
1975 deaths